Falstone is a small village in Northumberland, England, just east of Kielder Water. The name Falstone means "speckled stone". Much of the village is clustered around its two churches, St. Peter's Anglican and the United Reformed Church.

Falstone holds a popular annual agricultural show.

Governance 
Falstone is in the parliamentary constituency of Hexham. Falstone has its own Parish council. 
Falstone parish was created in 1811 when the ancient parish of Simonburn was divided by Act of Parliament.

Transport 
Falstone was served by Falstone railway station on the Border Counties Railway which linked the Newcastle and Carlisle Railway, near Hexham, with the Border Union Railway at Riccarton Junction. The first section of the route was opened between Hexham and Chollerford in 1858, the remainder opening in 1862. The line was closed to passengers by British Railways in 1956.

References

External links

GENUKI (accessed: 1 November 2008) 
Northumberland Communities (accessed: 1 November 2008)
Falstone Show
Falstone Parish Council

Villages in Northumberland